Cangzhou Mighty Lions Football Club is a professional football club that currently participates in the Chinese Super League under licence from the Chinese Football Association (CFA). The team is based in Cangzhou, Hebei and their home stadium is the Cangzhou Stadium that has a seating capacity of 31,836. Their majority shareholder is the Yongchang Real Estate who own 70% of the shares of the club.

History
On February 25, 2011, the club was founded by Smart Hero International Trading Limited, Xiamen Dongyuhang Import & Export Co., Ltd., Xiamen City HS Sheng Industrial Co., Ltd. and Xiamen City Shengxin Metal Products Co., Ltd., on the basis of local amateur club Xiamen Dongyuhang, which just won the runners-up spot of China Amateur Football League last year, as Fujian Smart Hero F.C.. Within their debut season they played in the China League Two division within the 2011 league season where their home uniforms were yellow tops and black shorts. Fujian in their first season would win promotion to the 2012 China League One division via the League One relegation play-off in which Fujian beat Guizhou Zhicheng 6–5 in a penalty shootout.

In the 2012 China League One campaign Xu Hui was appointed as manager and he would lead the club to a third-place finish. This saw Yongchang Real Estate interested in the team and they  bought 70% shares of the club, which officially went through on January 18, 2013. The club moved to Hebei Province's capital city Shijiazhuang into the Yutong International Sports Center, changed the club's colors to blue and the team's name into Shijiazhuang Yongchang Junhao F.C.. On December 27, 2013 Yongchang Real Estate bought the remaining 30% shares of the club and on February 24, 2014 Shijiazhuang Yongchang Junhao F.C. changed their name to Shijiazhuang Yongchang F.C.(). In the 2014 league season Shijiazhuang Yongchang won promotion to the top tier in the first time in their history when they came runners-up within their division. The club's first act within the top flight was to change their English name to Shijiazhuang Ever Bright F.C. (while their Chinese name still remained as 石家庄永昌) in January 2015.

The club's debut season within the top tier saw the club's manager Yasen Petrov able to guide the team to seventh in the league and safely away from relegation at the end of the 2015 league season. The following campaign would prove to be considerably more difficult and Yasen Petrov was relieved of his position on 14 July 2016 and replaced by Li Jinyu on a caretaker basis, after a run of bad form saw the club in a relegation battle. The club were relegated at the end of the 2016 Chinese Super League season and on 7 November 2016 brought in Afshin Ghotbi as their new coach for the following season. Fortunately, they remained contenders for promotion in the next few seasons, but despite earning third place in 2017, they failed to win promotion for the next two years.

They were promoted again in 2019 but finished last in the 2020 relegation tournament. They escaped relegation when Super League team Jiangsu F.C. dissolved in 2021. They were renamed as Cangzhou Mighty Lions, the same year Chinese FA sought to remove corporation names from team names.

Name history
2011–12: Fujian Smart Hero
2013: Shijiazhuang Yongchang Junhao 
2014: Shijiazhuang Yongchang
2015–2020: Shijiazhuang Ever Bright
2021–: Cangzhou Mighty Lions

Current squad

First team squad

Reserve squad
As of 7 March 2019

Out on loan

Coaching staff

Managerial history
Managers who have coached the club since they became a completely professional unit on February 25, 2011.

 Zhao Tuqiang (2011)
 Xu Hui (2012 – May 14, 2013)
 Xu Tao (interim) (May 14, 2013 – June 30, 2013)
 Li Shubin (Jun 30, 2013 – Dec 12, 2013)
 Yasen Petrov (Dec 12, 2013 – 14 Jul 2016)
 Li Jinyu (caretaker) (14 Jul 2016 – 7 Nov 2016)
  Afshin Ghotbi  (7 Nov 2016 – 3 Sep 2018)
 Yasen Petrov (8 Sep 2018 – 19 Jul 2019 )
  Afshin Ghotbi  (20 Jul 2019 – 6 Sep 2021)
 Liu Yan (caretaker)  (6 Sep 2021 – 3 Nov 2021)
 Svetozar Šapurić  (4 Nov 2021 – 20 February 2023)
 Zhao Junzhe  (21 February 2023 – )

Honours

League
 China League One
Runners-up (1): 2014

Results
All-time League Rankings

As of the end of 2019 season.

 In group stage.
 Avoided relegation due to the dissolution of Jiangsu Suning.
Key

 Pld = Played
 W = Games won
 D = Games drawn
 L = Games lost
 F = Goals for
 A = Goals against
 Pts = Points
 Pos = Final position

 DNQ = Did Not Qualify
 DNE = Did Not Enter
 NH = Not Held
 – = Does Not Exist
 R1 = Round 1
 R2 = Round 2
 R3 = Round 3
 R4 = Round 4

 F = Final
 SF = Semi-finals
 QF = Quarter-finals
 R16 = Round of 16
 Group = Group stage
 GS2 = Second Group stage
 QR1 = First Qualifying Round
 QR2 = Second Qualifying Round
 QR3 = Third Qualifying Round

References

External links
 Official Site 

 
Football clubs in China
Shijiazhuang
Chinese Super League clubs